Kohukohu may refer to:

Pittosporum tenuifolium, a small evergreen tree (Māori name)
Kohukohu, New Zealand, a settlement in the Northland region of New Zealand